Terry Edwards (born 10 August 1960) is an English musician who plays trumpet, flugelhorn, saxophones, guitar and keyboards.

Biography
Edwards gained a degree in music from the University of East Anglia in 1982, where he was also a founding member of The Higsons. He produced and played on the debut album by Yeah Jazz called Six Lane Ends. He has subsequently performed and released records both as a solo artist and with his band The Scapegoats. He has played as a session musician and as a collaborator with Derek Raymond (on the Dora Suarez album), Madness, Mark Bedford, Tindersticks, Spiritualized, Siouxsie, The Creatures, Nick Cave, The Jesus and Mary Chain, Department S, Lydia Lunch, Faust, Snuff, Tom Waits, Jack, The Blockheads, Hot Chip, and Robyn Hitchcock.

Edwards joined Gallon Drunk in 1993, staying with the band through the recording of three albums. Also in 1993 he made a guest live appearance with PJ Harvey, later in 1997, he was a guest studio musician for the band.

He collaborated with Lydia Lunch and other members of Gallon Drunk in Big Sexy Noise, and performed live with Lunch outside the band. More recently he has performed with the David Bowie supergroup, Holy Holy.

Since around 2015, Edwards has performed with PJ Harvey and appeared on the group's 2016 album The Hope Six Demolition Project.

He is also a member of The Near Jazz Experience with Madness bassist Mark Bedford & former Higsons drummer Simon Charterton.

Solo discography

Albums
 New York New York (1985), Izuma – as New York New York
 Dora Suarez (1993), Clawfist – with Derek Raymond and James Johnston
 I Didn't Get Where I Am Today  (1997), Wiiija – Terry Edwards and the Scapegoats
 My Wife Doesn't Understand Me (1997), Artlos/Stim – Terry Edwards and the Scapegoats
 Yesterday's Zeitgeist : Terry Edwards in Concert (1999), Sartorial
 Terry Edwards Presents No Fish Is Too Weird For Her Aquarium Vol. II (2000), Sartorial
 681 at the Southbank + Plays, Salutes & Executes (2002), Sartorial
 Memory and Madness (2003), Sartorial/Widowspeak – with Lydia Lunch
 Terry Edwards (2005), Sartorial

Compilations
 Plays Salutes And Executes (1993), Stim
 Terry Edwards' Large Door (18 Tracks From The Golden Age Of Vinyl) (1998), Damaged Goods
 Terry Edwards Presents... Queer Street – No Fish Is Too Weird For Her Aquarium Vol. III (2003), Sartorial

EPs
 Terry Edwards Plays The Music of Jim & William Reid (1991), Stim
 Terry Edwards Salutes The Magic of the Fall (1991), Stim
 Terry Edwards Executes Miles Davis Numbers (1992), Stim
 Boots Off!!, Wiija – Terry Edwards and the Scapegoats

Singles
 "Roger Wilson Said" (1983), Urchin – as New York New York
 "I Wanna Be Like You" (1985), Beach Culture – as New York New York
 "Well You Needn't" (1994), Rough Trade
 "Head Up High" (1998), Flighted Miskick – Scousemartins fet. Terry Edwards
 "Girls & Boys" (1988), Damaged Goods – Terry Edwards and the Scapegoats
 "Ice Cream for Crow" (1998), Damaged Goods – Terry Edwards and the Scapegoats
 "Cat People/Gasoline" (2007), Sartorial – Terry Edwards and the Scapegoats, split with Department S
 "Three Blind Mice" (2008), The Orchestra Pit – Terry Edwards and the Scapegoats
 "Boots Off !!!" (2009), Sartorial – Terry Edwards and the Scapegoats, split with Cure-Ator
 "I'll Go Crazy" (2010), Sartorial
 "Let's Surf"/"Old Man's Hands" (2011), Sartorial – Terry Edwards and The Dash/Terry Edwards and Darren Hayman
 "You Won't See Me" (2011), Sartorial – split with Robyn Hitchcock

See also
 Hux Records
 List of Peel sessions
 Phoenix Festival
 Wiiija

References

External links 
 
 

1960 births
Living people
People from Hornchurch
Alumni of the University of East Anglia
English rock musicians
English rock saxophonists
British male saxophonists
21st-century saxophonists
21st-century British male musicians
The Spatial AKA Orchestra members
Holy Holy (tribute band) members